WGDN can refer to:

 WGDN (AM), a radio station (1350 AM) licensed to Gladwin, Michigan, United States
 WGDN-FM, a radio station (103.1 FM) licensed to Gladwin, Michigan, United States